Smartwings Hungary Kft., formerly named Travel Service Hungary, is an airline based in Budapest, Hungary, operating charter flights out of Budapest Ferihegy International Airport. It was founded in 2001 and is a subsidiary of Smartwings from the Czech Republic.

Destinations 
As of August 2018, Smartwings Hungary offers flights to the following seasonal charter destinations:

Bulgaria
Burgas – Burgas Airport seasonal

Egypt
Hurghada – Hurghada International Airport seasonal
Sharm el-Sheikh – Sharm el-Sheikh International Airport seasonal

Greece
Corfu – Corfu International Airport seasonal
Heraklion – Heraklion International Airport seasonal

Rhodes – Rhodes International Airport seasonal
Zakynthos – Zakynthos International Airport seasonal

Hungary
Budapest – Budapest Ferenc Liszt International Airport base
Debrecen – Debrecen International Airport focus city

Spain
Barcelona – Barcelona El Prat Airport seasonal
Palma de Mallorca – Palma de Mallorca Airport seasonal

Turkey
Antalya – Antalya Airport seasonal

Fleet 

Smartwings Hungary fleet consists of the following aircraft (as of March 2022). Smartwings Hungary operates also uses aircraft of their parent company Smartwings to cover its flights.

Accidents and incidents 
A Boeing 737-800, operating flight 6H716 on behalf of Israeli airline Israir between Budapest, Hungary, and Tel Aviv, Israel, was involved in an accident on 23 March 2018, when just as the aircraft was being pushed back, a nearby tow truck began emitting thick smoke. This was sucked into the cabin by the aircraft's engine, causing an emergency evacuation. One woman was seriously injured, because she fell off the wing.

References

External links

 Official website

Airlines established in 2001
Airlines of Hungary
Hungarian companies established in 2001

he:Travel Service Airlines
hu:Travel Service